Mi Sangre (My Blood) is the third studio album by Colombian singer-songwriter Juanes, released on September 28, 2004.

Re-releases 
In 2005, a 'Tour Edition' of the album was released. This specially packaged re-release of Mi Sangre is an individually numbered, limited edition of 150,000 copies. Within its triple gatefold are two booklets — the CD's lyric book, a fold-out booklet with full credits of the current version, and many press quotes. The CD contains the regular album's 12 tracks, live versions of "A Dios le Pido," "La Camisa Negra," "Fotografía," and "Nada Valgo Sin Tu Amor". Bonus tracks include "La Paga", which features Taboo from The Black Eyed Peas, a remix of "La Camisa Negra," and the unreleased track "Lo Que Importa". "Lo Que Importa" was originally made for the album "Fijate Bien". The second disc is a DVD featuring all four videos shot for the album.

The 2005 Mexican double CD contains the regular album's 12 tracks too, but different bonus tracks and no DVD. Just like the regular Tour Edition, it contains bonus tracks "Lo Que Importa" and "La Paga", though the other bonus tracks are songs from his debut album Fíjate Bien; "Nada," "Fíjate Bien" and "Podemos Hacernos Daño". This edition also contains two other bonus tracks; an acoustic version of his first worldwide hit "A Dios le Pido" and a different remix of "La Camisa Negra."

As result of the big success after releasing "La Camisa Negra" at the end of 2005 and beginning of 2006, a Special European Tour edition was also released. The only difference between this version and the regular version is that the European version doesn't have the unreleased track "Lo Que Importa". The album also has a remix of "La Camisa Negra". In June 2006 a 2 disc limited edition was released in Germany. The first disc is the same as the Special European Tour edition. The second disc includes 6 songs performed live from the Shepherds Bush Empire in London.

The album was successful in the United States. As of 2019, the album has been certified 18× Platinum by the RIAA for selling 1,008,000 album-equivalent units in the country. In France, the album sold 300,000 copies as of 2014. Worldwide sales it estimated around 4 millions of copies.

Track listing

Normal CD 
 "Ámame" (Love Me) – 4:19
 "Para Tu Amor" (For Your Love) (feat. string arrangements by David Campbell) – 4:09
 "Sueños" (Dreams) – 3:10
 "La Camisa Negra" (The Black Shirt) – 3:36
 "Nada Valgo Sin Tu Amor" (I'm Worthless Without Your Love) – 3:16
 "No Siento Penas" (I Don't Have Regrets) – 3:53
 "Dámelo" (Give It to Me) – 4:07
 "Lo Que Me Gusta a Mí" (What I Like) (feat. string arrangements by David Campbell) – 3:30
 "Rosario Tijeras" (Rosario Tijeras) – 3:27
 "¿Qué Pasa?" (What's Happening?) – 3:47
 "Volverte a Ver" (To See You Again) – 3:37
 "Tu Guardián" (Your Guardian) – 4:25

Videoclips 
 Para Tu Amor
 La Camisa Negra
 Nada Valgo Sin Tu Amor
 Rosario Tijeras
 Volverte A Ver

Tour Edition (2005)

Mexican 2CD (2005)

European Tour and Brazilian Editions (2006)

Limited Edition [Germany] 2006

Charts

Certifications and sales 

|-
!scope="row"|Romania (UFPR)
|Platinum
|
|-

Singles

Awards 
 2005 Latin Grammy Awards:
 Best Rock Song ("Nada Valgo Sin Tu Amor") – won
 Best Short Form Music Video ("Volverte a Ver") – won
 Rock Solo Vocal Album (Mi Sangre) – won

See also
2004 in Latin music
 List of best-selling Latin albums
List of best-selling Latin albums in the United States
List of certified albums in Romania

References 

Juanes albums
2004 albums
Universal Music Latino albums
Latin Grammy Award for Best Rock Solo Vocal Album
Song recordings produced by Gustavo Santaolalla
Albums produced by Gustavo Santaolalla